HMS Capetown was a  light cruiser of the Royal Navy, named after the South African city of Cape Town. So far she has been the only ship of the Royal Navy to bear the name.  She was part of the Carlisle group of the C-class of cruisers.

She was laid down by Cammell Laird on 23 February 1918, and launched on 28 June 1918.  She was sailed to Pembroke Dock for outfitting, a process finally completed in February 1922, following which she was assigned to the America and West Indies Station, based at the Royal Naval Dockyard, on Ireland Island in Bermuda until 1929.  Capetown was commissioned too late to see action in the First World War, but served in the Second World War.  Like most of her sisters, she was originally assigned to the Mediterranean and later to the Red Sea.

She spent a large part of her career with the Eastern Fleet, including a period between the wars from July 1934 until August 1938, when she returned to the United Kingdom for a refit. She rejoined the Mediterranean  Fleet in August 1940. While deployed in the Red Sea, she was torpedoed and severely damaged by the Italian motor torpedo boat MAS 213 off Massawa, on 6 April 1941. Seven members of her crew lost their lives. After a year of repairs at Bombay, she served with the Eastern Fleet until 1943. She then returned to the UK and joined the Home Fleet.

During the Normandy landings in June 1944 Capetown was deployed as a Shuttle Control/Depot ship at Mulberry A placed to seaward in order to direct incoming convoys to berths or anchorages.  was anchored inshore to control returning convoys of unloaded vessels with Shuttle Control Command for both ships being embarked in Capetown. Shuttle Control Command was responsible for keeping the Army informed of expected arrivals and directing them to the proper unloading sectors.

She survived the war and was sold on 5 April 1946.  She arrived at the yards of Ward of Preston for breaking up on 2 June 1946.

Citations

References
 
 
 
 
 
 
 
 

 

C-class cruisers
Ships built on the River Mersey
1918 ships
World War I cruisers of the United Kingdom
World War II cruisers of the United Kingdom